Richard Stacey (1663–1743) was an English shipbuilder and ship designer employed by the Royal Navy at several dockyards but predominantly Deptford.

Life

He was probably apprenticed as a shipwright around 1677. He was appointed a master mastmaker and boat-builder at Plymouth Dockyard by the Royal Navy in November 1695.

In 1698 he transferred briefly to Kinsale where he launched HMS Kinsale at Cork Docks in Ireland. He then worked for a few months at Sheerness Dockyard in 1705 before being appointed Master Shipwright at Woolwich Dockyard in November 1705.

He was personally responsible for designing the Flamborough class of ship in 1706. In 1708/9 he designed HMS Delight (1709) in Woolwich but this was completed by Jacob Ackworth as in August 1709 Stacey was appointed master shipwright at Portsmouth Dockyard one of the most important in Britain and created a large number of vessels there. In July 1715 he moved to be Master of Deptford Dockyard the most important in Britain at that time. In 1721 he designed the Cruizer class ship and in 1725 the sloop HMS Happy. His Royal warrant to design and build ships was renewed in 1727.

In 1731 he designed HMS Wolf and in 1732 HMS Hound.

He died on 16 June 1743. He is buried in the floor of the nave of St John the Baptist church in Sutton-at-Hone near Dartford in Kent.

Ships built

HMS Chichester (1706) 80-gun ship of the line at Chatham Dockyard
HMS Elizabeth (1706)  70-gun ship of the line at Portsmouth Dockyard
HMS Flamborough (1707) 24-gun ship launched at Woolwich Dockyard
HMS Gosport (1707) 42-fun frigate built at Woolwich Dockyard
HMS Squirrel (1707) 24-gun ship at Woolwich Dockyard
HMS Falmouth (1708) 54-gun ship of the line built at Woolwich Dockyard
HMS Royal Anne 42-gun galley built at Woolwich Dockyard
HMS Fowey (1709) 42-gun frigate built at Portsmouth Dockyard
HMS Dolphin (1711) 36-gun ship built at Portsmouth Dockyard
HMS Solebay (1711) 24-gun ship built at Portsmouth Dockyard
HMS Launceston (1711) 42-gun frigate built at Portsmouth Dockyard
HMS Seahorse (1712) 24-gun ship built at Portsmouth Dockyard
HMS Success (1712) 42-gun ship built at Portsmouth Dockyard
HMS Dorsetshire (1712) rebuilding of 80-gun ship of the line built at Northam, Devon
HMS Expedition (1714) second rebuild of 70-gun ship of the line built at Portsmouth Dockyard
HMS Rochester (1716) 54-gun ship of the line built at Deptford Dockyard
HMS Speedwell (1716) 42-gun ship built at Deptford Dockyard
HMS Barfleur (1716) 90-gun ship of the line built at Deptford Dockyard
HMS Medway (1718) 60-gun ship of the line built at Deptford Dockyard
HMS Dursley Galley 20-gun frigate built at Deptford Dockyard
HMS Greyhound (1719) 20-gun frigate built at Deptford Dockyard
HMS Torbay (1719) 80-gun ship of the line built at Deptford Dockyard
HMS Nottingham (1719) 60-gun ship of the line built at Deptford Dockyard
HMS Blandford (1720) 20-gun frigate built at Deptford Dockyard
HMS Falkland (1720) 50-gun ship of the line built at Deptford Dockyard
HMS Lyme (1720) 20-gun frigate built at Deptford Dockyard
HMS Katherine (1721) 8-gun yacht built at Deptford Dockyard
HMS Bonetta (1721) 4-gun sloop built at Deptford Dockyard
HMS Otter (1721) 6-gun sloop built at Deptford Dockyard
HMS Chatham (1721) 50-gun ship of the line built at Deptford Dockyard
HMS Cruizer (1721) 8-gun sloop built at Deptford Dockyard
HMS Burford (1722) 70-gun ship of the line built at Deptford Dockyard
HMS Scarborough (1722) 20-gun frigate built at Deptford Dockyard
HMS Spence (1723) 8-gun sloop built at Deptford Dockyard
HMS Diamond (1723) 40-gun ship of the line built at Deptford Dockyard
HMS Berwick (1723) 70-gun ship of the line built at Deptford Dockyard
HMS Shark (1723) 10-gun sloop built at Deptford Dockyard
HMS Prince George (1723) 90-gun ship of the line at Chatham Dockyard a huge ship with a crew of 750
HMS Seaford (1724) 20 gun frigate built at Deptford Dockyard
HMS Happy (1725) 10 gun sloop built at Deptford Dockyard
HMS Romney (1726) 50-gun ship of the line built at Deptford Dockyard
HMS Pearl (1726) 40-gun ship of the line built at Deptford Dockyard
HMS Gibraltar (1727) 20 gun frigate built at Deptford Dockyard
HMS Fox (1727) 20 gun frigate built at Deptford Dockyard
Mary, 8 gun yacht built at Deptford Dockyard
HMS Drake (1729) 8 gun sloop built at Deptford Dockyard
HMS Torrington (1729) 40-gun ship built at Deptford Dockyard
HMS Namur (1729) 90-gun ship of the line built at Deptford Dockyard a huge ship with crew of 750
HMS Windsor (1729) 60-gun ship of the line built at Deptford Dockyard 
HMS Spence (1730) 8 gun sloop built at Deptford Dockyard 
HMS Terrible (1730) 6 gun bomb vessel built at Deptford Dockyard 
HMS Buckingham (1731) 70-gun ship of the line built at Deptford Dockyard
HMS Sheerness (1732) 20 gun frigate built at Deptford Dockyard 
HMS Dolphin (1732) 20 gun frigate built at Deptford Dockyard 
HMS Tartar (1734) 20 gun frigate built at Deptford Dockyard 
HMS Prince of Orange (1734) 70-gun ship of the line built at Deptford Dockyard 
HMS Eltham (1736) 40 gun ship built at Deptford Dockyard
HMS Kennington (1736) 20 gun ship built at Deptford Dockyard 
HMS Lion (1738) 60-gun ship of the line built at Deptford Dockyard 
HMS Boyne (1739) 80-gun ship of the line built at Deptford Dockyard
HMS Woolwich (1741) 50 gun ship of the line built at Deptford Dockyard 
HMS Revenge (1742) 70-gun ship of the line built at Deptford Dockyard

Richard Stacey the Younger

As works (in Portsmouth) continue in Stacey's name after his death it may be assumed that these are by his son. These include:

HMS Prince Frederick (1740) 70 gun ship of the line built at Portsmouth Dockyard
HMS Royal William (1757) 84 gun ship of the line built at Portsmouth Dockyard

Family

He was married to Christian (1677-1713). They had a daughter, Elizabeth.

References

1663 births
1743 deaths
English shipbuilders